Duncan Gregory Stroik (born January 14, 1962), usually credited as Duncan G. Stroik, is an American architect, a professor of architecture at the University of Notre Dame School of Architecture, and founding editor of the Sacred Architecture Journal. His work continues the tradition of classical and Palladian architecture, also known as New Classical Architecture.

Stroik specializes in all aspects of Roman Catholic sacred architecture. In his academic work, Stroik has stressed the importance of tradition, and advocated beauty as the principal standard of architecture. In 2016 Stroik was honored with the Arthur Ross Award for recognition of excellence in the classical tradition.

Early life and career

Stroik received a bachelor's degree from the University of Virginia School of Architecture in 1984 and a master's degree in architecture from Yale School of Architecture in 1987. After graduating from Yale, Stroik worked as a designer in the office of Allan Greenberg. In 1990, Stroik joined the Notre Dame School of Architecture as a founding faculty member of the school's classical program. In that same year, he founded his firm, Duncan G. Stroik Architect LLC.

Institute for Sacred Architecture and The Sacred Architecture Journal
In 1998, Stroik founded the Institute for Sacred Architecture, a non-profit organization dedicated to a renewal of beauty in contemporary church design. The institute’s principal activity is the twice yearly publication of the Sacred Architecture Journal, which Stroik edits, and which is dedicated to an ongoing discussion of current issues in the field of sacred architecture.

Major projects
Stroik's major projects include:

 Chapel of the Holy Cross on the Jesuit High School campus in Tampa, Florida
 All Saints Church in Walton, Kentucky
 St. Augustine Cathedral in Kalamazoo, Michigan
 Christ Chapel at Hillsdale College in Hillsdale, Michigan
 Our Lady of the Most Holy Trinity on the Thomas Aquinas College campus
 The Shrine of Our Lady of Guadalupe in La Crosse, Wisconsin
 St. Margaret Mary Parish in Bullhead City, Arizona
 St. Theresa School and Education Center in Sugar Land, Texas
 St. Catherine of Siena Church in Trumbull, Connecticut
 St. Joseph Cathedral in Sioux Falls, South Dakota
 Organ case in St. Paul's Cathedral in Saint Paul, Minnesota
 Villa Indiana in South Bend, Indiana

St. Augustine Cathedral

A renovation of Saint Augustine Church designed by Ralph Adams Cram in 1951 is meant to architecturally make the interior worthy of its current "cathedral" designation.

Classical elements of the design include touches of Gothic to respond to the original style of the cathedral. Updates include a new marble sanctuary floor, predella, baldacchino, ambo, cathedra, new and restored altars, and an interior decorative paint scheme.

Cathedral of Saint Joseph

The "creative restoration" of this early twentieth century cathedral designed by Emmanuel Louis Masqueray restored the interior to its former glory.

The barrel vault, arches, and circular motifs are brought to a crescendo in the circular baldacchino that highlights the altar. This circular theme is repeated in the plan of the ambo or pulpit and in the arches at the bishop's cathedra and the high altar. A new decorative marble floor was installed throughout the entire church replacing the monochromatic stone tile. Also, the mechanical, electrical, sound reinforcement, and lighting systems were replaced including new custom chandeliers replicated from photographs of the originals.

Thomas Aquinas College chapel
Set in the heart of the Thomas Aquinas College campus, Our Lady of the Most Holy Trinity Chapel was dedicated on March 7, 2009. Stroik's design for this , $23 million chapel references Early Christian, Spanish Mission and Renaissance architecture. Stroik designed the chapel as cruciform in shape and featuring both a  bell tower and an  dome. In 2003 Pope John Paul II blessed the chapel's plans, and in 2008, Pope Benedict XVI blessed its cornerstone.

Shrine of Our Lady of Guadalupe

The Shrine of Our Lady of Guadalupe, in La Crosse, Wisconsin is the vision of Cardinal Raymond Leo Burke who wanted to create a national pilgrimage site in the Diocese of La Crosse. The shrine is situated amidst  of woodland near the south end of La Crosse. On July 31, 2008 the Shrine Church was dedicated, with the dedication Mass presided over by Cardinal Burke, who was joined by Cardinals Justin Rigali of Philadelphia and Francis George of Chicago.

Organ case at the Cathedral of Saint Paul
The organ case at the Cathedral of Saint Paul, National Shrine of the Apostle Paul draws from the original unbuilt design by Emmanuel Louis Masqueray but also refines it, preserving the view of the rose window. The existing split organ system was restored and 123 new organ ranks have been installed. The new organ case is constructed of walnut with hand carved detailing and gilding. Two human sized hand carved angels with instruments adorn the organ case while Saint Cecilia, patron saint of music, stands atop the central dome below the rose window. There is choir loft seating between the organ case.

Selected publications
 Church Building as a Sacred Place: Beauty, Transcendence, and the Eternal (Chicago: Hillenbrand, 2012).
 Reconquering Sacred Space 2000: The Church in the City of the Third Millennium (2012). Edited by Duncan Stroik, Cristiano Rosponi, and Giampaolo Rossi

Selected awards

 "Palladio Award" for Our Lady of the Most Holy Trinity Chapel (2022) Traditional Building Magazine
 "Addison Mizner Award" for The Chapel of the Holy Cross (2019) Institute of Classical Architecture and Art
 "Clem Labine Award" (2017) Traditional Building Magazine
 "Arthur Ross Award" for Architecture (2016)
 "Palladio Award" for The Cathedral of Saint Paul Organ Case (2014) Traditional Building Magazine
 "Copper in Architecture Award" for the Basilica of the National Shrine of Mary Help of Christians at Holy Hill. (2014) Copper Development Association, Inc.
 "Acanthus Award of Arete" for Restoration and Renovation of The Cathedral of Saint Joseph (2013) Institute of Classical Architecture and Art
 "Palladio Award" for Restoration and Renovation of The Cathedral of Saint Joseph (2013) Traditional Building Magazine
 "Henry Hering Memorial Medal: Art and Architecture Award" for the Shrine of Our Lady of Guadalupe (2012) National Sculpture Society
 "Indiana Design Award" for the Shrine of Our Lady of Guadalupe (2012) American Institute of Architects, Indiana
 "Palladio Award" for New Design & Construction - less than 30,000 sq.ft. for Our Lady of the Most Holy Trinity (2011) Traditional Building Magazine
 "Tucker Design Award" for Our Lady of the Most Holy Trinity Chapel (2010) Building Stone Institute
 "Brick in Architecture Award" for Saint Theresa Education Center (2010) Brick Industry Association
 "Indiana Design Award" for Villa Indiana (1998) American Institute of Architects, Indiana

Bibliography
 Michael Tamara. "Crisis Magazine." How Lovely (Again) is Thy Dwelling Place (September 2014)
 Martha McDonald. "Sacred Architecture in the New Century." Traditional Building (December 2014): 6-11.
 Nancy A. Ruhling. "Architectural Organ Case." Traditional Building (June 2014). 21-23
 Elizabeth Lev. "Beautiful Homes for Communion with God." Zenit (July 5, 2013).
 Jennifer Adams. "Cathedral undergoes a 'creative restoration'." Stone World Magazine (May 2013): 70-79.
 Martha McDonald. "Creative Restoration." Traditional Building (December 2012): 28-31.
 Joseph Pronechen. "Altar Rails Returns to Use." National Catholic Register (July 2011): B4.
 Lynne Lavelle. "Sacred Mission." Traditional Building (June 2011): 20-23.
 Alexis Fisher. "Chapel Design Reflects College Mission." Stone World Magazine (July 2010): 116-128.
 Catesby Leigh. "A Return to Grace." Wall Street Journal (March 18, 2010): D7.
 Bradford McKee. "Our Lady of the Most Holy Trinity." Architect (December 2009): 69-76.

References

External links

 
 Institute for Sacred Architecture
 Hillsdale College website
 Shrine website
 Thomas Aquinas College website
 Notre Dame School of Architecture
 Book Review of The Church Building as a Sacred Place

Architects of Roman Catholic churches
Architecture academics
New Classical architects
21st-century American architects
University of Virginia School of Architecture alumni
Yale School of Architecture alumni
1962 births
Living people
American Roman Catholics